Columbia City is a city in Columbia County, Oregon,  United States. It was named for its location on the Columbia River. The population was 1,946 at the 2010 census.

History

Columbia City was founded in 1867 by Jacob and Joseph Caples. In 1870, the town had aspirations of becoming the terminus for Ben Holladay's Willamette Valley railroad. The same year, Portland became the terminus of the west-side line, but the railroad never reached Columbia City. Columbia City post office was established in 1871. In 1902 the Columbia and Nehalem Valley Railroad was built as a forest railway towards Yankton.

During World War I Columbia City built ships for the war effort, which was run by the Sommartson Shipbuilding Co. Sommartson Shipbuilding Co. Images They were ideally situated due to the channel coming so close to shore. The contracts were cancelled at the end of the war.

Currently, Columbia City serves as a suburb of St. Helens.

Geography

Climate
This region experiences warm (but not hot) and dry summers, with no average monthly temperatures above .  According to the Köppen Climate Classification system, Columbia City has a warm-summer Mediterranean climate, abbreviated "Csb" on climate maps.

Demographics

2010 census
As of the census of 2010, there were 1,946 people, 787 households, and 601 families residing in the city. The racial makeup of the city was 94.6% White, 0.1% African American, 1.0% Native American, 1.5% Asian, 0.1% Pacific Islander, 1.0% from other races, and 1.7% from two or more races. Hispanic or Latino of any race were 3.0% of the population.

There were 787 households, of which 26.4% had children under the age of 18 living with them, 64.2% were married couples living together, 8.3% had a female householder with no husband present, 3.9% had a male householder with no wife present, and 23.6% were non-families. 18.4% of all households were made up of individuals, and 7.9% had someone living alone who was 65 years of age or older. The average household size was 2.47 and the average family size was 2.74.

The median age in the city was 48.4 years. 18.6% of residents were under the age of 18; 6.7% were between the ages of 18 and 24; 20.4% were from 25 to 44; 36% were from 45 to 64; and 18.4% were 65 years of age or older. The gender makeup of the city was 48.8% male and 51.2% female.

2000 census
As of the census of 2000, there were 1,571 people, 595 households, and 448 families residing in the city. The population density was 2,106.6 people per square mile (808.8/km2). There were 640 housing units at an average density of 858.2 per square mile (329.5/km2). The racial makeup of the city was 95.61% White, 0.38% African American, 1.34% Native American, 0.70% Asian, 0.51% from other races, and 1.46% from two or more races. Hispanic or Latino of any race were 2.04% of the population. 19.9% were of German, 11.9% English, 11.0% Irish, 7.9% American, 6.5% Norwegian and 5.3% Scottish ancestry according to Census 2000.

There were 595 households, out of which 32.9% had children under the age of 18 living with them, 67.2% were married couples living together, 5.4% had a female householder with no husband present, and 24.7% were non-families. 19.0% of all households were made up of individuals, and 7.6% had someone living alone who was 65 years of age or older. The average household size was 2.63 and the average family size was 2.97.

In the city, the population was spread out, with 25.8% under the age of 18, 6.0% from 18 to 24, 25.5% from 25 to 44, 30.6% from 45 to 64, and 12.2% who were 65 years of age or older. The median age was 40 years. For every 100 females, there were 105.4 males. For every 100 females age 18 and over, there were 99.0 males.

The median income for a household in the city was $59,545, and the median income for a family was $62,596. Males had a median income of $46,964 versus $33,125 for females. The per capita income for the city was $25,266. About 2.8% of families and 4.5% of the population were below the poverty line, including 5.1% of those under age 18 and 3.7% of those age 65 or over.

References

External links
Entry for Columbia City in the Oregon Blue Book
Historic Photos of Columbia City

Cities in Oregon
Cities in Columbia County, Oregon
Oregon populated places on the Columbia River
1867 establishments in Oregon
Populated places established in 1867